Opus Dei, formally known as the Prelature of the Holy Cross and Opus Dei, is an institution of the Catholic Church, whose members seek to implement Christian ideals in their occupations and in general society.

Lay people make up the majority of its membership; the remainder are secular priests under the governance of a prelate elected by specific members and appointed by the Pope. Opus Dei is Latin for "Work of God"; hence the organization is often referred to by members and supporters as the Work.

Opus Dei was founded in Spain in 1928 by Catholic priest Josemaría Escrivá and was given final church approval in 1950 by Pope Pius XII. John Paul II made it a personal prelature in 1982 by the apostolic constitution Ut sit; that is, the jurisdiction of the Opus Dei's head covers members wherever they are, rather than geographical dioceses. On 14 July 2022, Pope Francis issued the apostolic letter Ad charisma tuendum, which transferred responsibility for the Opus Dei from the Dicastery for Bishops to the Dicastery for the Clergy and decreed that the head of the Opus Dei cannot become a bishop. While Opus Dei has met controversies, it remains influential within the Church.

As of 2018, there are 95,318 members of the Prelature: 93,203 lay persons and 2,115 priests. These figures do not include the diocesan priest members of Opus Dei's Priestly Society of the Holy Cross, estimated to number 2,000 in the year 2005. Members are located in more than 90 countries. About 70% of Opus Dei members live in their own homes, leading family lives with secular careers, while the other 30% are celibate, of whom the majority live in Opus Dei centers. Aside from their personal charity and social work, Opus Dei members organize training in Catholic spirituality applied to daily life; members are involved in running universities, university residences, schools, publishing houses, hospitals, and technical and agricultural training centers.

History

Foundational period

Opus Dei was founded by Josemaría Escrivá de Balaguer on 2 October 1928 in Madrid, Spain. According to Escrivá, on that day he experienced a vision in which he "saw Opus Dei". He gave the organization the name "Opus Dei", which in Latin means "Work of God", in order to underscore the belief that the organization was not his (Escrivá's) work, but was rather God's work. Throughout his life, Escrivá held that the founding of Opus Dei had a supernatural character. Escrivá summarized Opus Dei's mission as a way of helping ordinary Christians "to understand that their life... is a way of holiness and evangelization... And to those who grasp this ideal of holiness, the Work offers the spiritual assistance and training they need to put it into practice."

Initially, Opus Dei was open only to men, but in 1930, Escrivá started to admit women, based on what he believed to be a communication from God. When the Spanish Civil War ended in 1939, Escrivá was able to return to Madrid after three years of hiding. Escrivá later recounted that it was in Spain where Opus Dei found "the greatest difficulties" because of "enemies of personal freedom," and traditionalists who he felt misunderstood Opus Dei's ideas. Despite this, Opus Dei grew during the years of the Franquismo, spreading first throughout Spain, and after 1945, expanding internationally.

In 1939, Escrivá published The Way, a collection of 999 maxims concerning spirituality for people involved in secular affairs. In the 1940s, Opus Dei found an early critic in the Jesuit Superior General Wlodimir Ledóchowski, who told the Vatican that he considered Opus Dei "very dangerous for the Church in Spain," citing its "secretive character" and calling it "a form of Christian Masonry."

In 1947, a year after Escrivá moved the organization's headquarters to Rome, Opus Dei received a decree of praise and approval from Pope Pius XII, making it an institute of "pontifical right", i.e. under the direct governance of the Pope. In 1950,  Pius XII granted definitive approval to Opus Dei, thereby allowing married people to join the organization, and secular clergy to be admitted to the Priestly Society of the Holy Cross.

Several Opus Dei members such as Alberto Ullastres were ministers under the dictator Franco in Spain (see Opus Dei and politics).

Post-foundational years
In 1975, Escrivá died and was succeeded by Álvaro del Portillo. In 1982, Opus Dei was made into a personal prelature. This means that Opus Dei is part of the Catholic Church, and the apostolate of the members falls under the direct jurisdiction of the prelate of Opus Dei wherever they are. As to "what the law lays down for all the ordinary faithful", the lay members of Opus Dei, being no different from other Catholics, "continue to be [...] under the jurisdiction of the diocesan bishop", in the words of John Paul II's Apostolic Constitution, Ut Sit.

One-third of the world's bishops sent letters petitioning for the canonization of Escrivá. Escrivá was beatified in 1992 in the midst of controversy prompted by questions about his suitability for sainthood. In 2002, approximately 300,000 people gathered in St. Peter's Square on the day Pope John Paul II canonized him. According to John L. Allen Jr., "Escrivá is... venerated by millions".

There are other members whose process of beatification has been opened: Ernesto Cofiño, a father of five children and a pioneer in pediatric research in Guatemala; Montserrat Grases, a teenage Catalan student who died of cancer; Toni Zweifel, a Swiss engineer; Tomás Alvira and wife, Paquita Domínguez, a Spanish married couple; Isidoro Zorzano Ledesma, an Argentinian engineer;  Dora del Hoyo, a domestic worker; Fr. Josemaria Hernandez Garnica;  and Father José Luis Múzquiz de Miguel, a Spanish priest who began Opus Dei in the United States.

During the pontificate of John Paul II, two members of Opus Dei, Juan Luis Cipriani Thorne and Julián Herranz Casado, were made cardinals.

In September 2005, Pope Benedict XVI blessed a newly installed statue of Josemaría Escrivá placed in an outside wall niche of St Peter's Basilica, a place for founders of Catholic organizations.

During that same year, Opus Dei received attention due to the success of the novel The Da Vinci Code, in which both Opus Dei and the Catholic Church itself work against the protagonists. The film version was released globally in May 2006, further polarizing views on the organization.

In 2014, Pope Francis through a delegate beatified Alvaro del Portillo and said that "he teaches us that in the simplicity and ordinariness of our life we can find a sure path to holiness.

At the end of 2014, the prelature has been established in 69 countries, while its members are present in 90 countries.

Javier Echevarría Rodríguez, the second prelate of Opus Dei, died on 12 December 2016, and was succeeded by Fernando Ocáriz. He was elected the new prelate of Opus Dei on 23 January 2017, and on the same day was appointed by Pope Francis as such.

In 2019, Guadalupe Ortiz de Landázuri, one of the first women who joined Opus Dei, was beatified in Madrid, Spain. She is the first lay faithful, as well as the first woman, in Opus Dei to be beatified.

Sexual abuse cases 
In 2005, the first publicly-known sexual abuse case of Opus Dei in the US, against C. John McCloskey, was settled for $977,000. Opus Dei publicly acknowledged a sexual abuse case within the organisation for the first time in its history in July 2020, this one involving priest Manuel Cociña in Spain.

Reform decreed by Pope Francis 
On 22 July 2022, Pope Francis issued the apostolic letter in the form of a motu proprio Ad charisma tuendum. Among other things, the new disposition decrees that the head of the Opus Dei "shall not be honoured with the episcopal order", but "is granted, by reason of his office, the use of the title of Supernumerary Apostolic Protonotary with the title of Reverend Monsignor and therefore may use the insignia [including heraldic devices] corresponding to this title". It also transfers responsibility for the personal prelature Opus Dei from the Dicastery for Bishops to the Dicastery for the Clergy, conforming to the apostolic constitution Praedicate evangelium, and mandates revision of the statutes of the personal prelature to bring them into conformity with these reforms. This reform became effective on 4 August 2022, and is viewed as reducing the power and influence of the prelature within the Catholic church.

Spirituality

Doctrine

Opus Dei is an organization of the Catholic Church. As such, it shares the doctrines of the Catholic Church and has "no other teaching than the teaching of the Magisterium of the Holy See", as per the founder.

Opus Dei places special emphasis on certain aspects of Catholic doctrine. A central feature of Opus Dei's theology is its focus on the lives of the ordinary Catholics who are neither priests nor monks. Opus Dei emphasizes the "universal call to holiness": the belief that everyone should aspire to be a saint, as per Jesus' commandment to "Love God with all your heart" (Matthew 22:37) and "Be perfect as your heavenly Father is perfect." (Matthew 5:48) Opus Dei also teaches that sanctity is within the reach of everyone, not just a few special individuals, given Jesus' teaching that his demands are "easy" and "light," as his divine assistance is assured.

Opus Dei does not have monks or nuns, and only a minority of its members are priests. Opus Dei emphasizes uniting spiritual life with professional, social, and family life. Members of Opus Dei lead ordinary lives, with traditional families and secular careers, and strive to "sanctify ordinary life". Indeed, Pope John Paul II called Escrivá "the saint of ordinary life".
 
Similarly, Opus Dei stresses the importance of work and professional competence. While some religious institutes encourage their members to withdraw from the material world, Opus Dei exhorts its members and all lay Catholics to "find God in daily life" and to perform their work excellently as a service to society and as a fitting offering to God. Opus Dei teaches that work not only contributes to social progress but is "a path to holiness".

The biblical roots of this Catholic doctrine, according to the founder, are in the phrase "God created man to work" (Genesis 2:15) and Jesus's long life as an ordinary carpenter in a small town. Escrivá, who stressed the Christian's duty to follow Christ's example, also points to the gospel account that Jesus "has done everything well" (Mark 7:37).

The foundation of the Christian life, stressed Escrivá, is divine filiation: Christians are children of God, identified with Christ's life and mission. Other main features of Opus Dei, according to its official literature, are freedom, respecting choice and taking personal responsibility, and charity, love of God above all and love of others.

At the bottom of Escrivá's understanding of the "universal call to holiness" are two dimensions, subjective and objective, according to Fernando Ocariz, a Catholic theologian and prelate of Opus Dei since 2017. The subjective is the call given to each person to become a saint, regardless of their place in society. The objective refers to what Escrivá calls Christian materialism: all of creation, even the most material situation, is a meeting place with God, and leads to union with him.

Prayers

All members – whether married or unmarried, priests or laypeople – are trained to follow a 'plan of life', or 'the norms of piety', which are some traditional Catholic devotions. This is meant to follow the teaching of the Catholic Catechism: "pray at specific times...to nourish continual prayer".

Mortification

As a spirituality for ordinary people, Opus Dei focuses on performing sacrifices pertaining to normal duties and to its emphasis on charity and cheerfulness. However, much public attention has focused on Opus Dei's practice of mortification—the voluntary offering up of discomfort or pain to God; this includes fasting, or for its celibate members, "corporal mortifications" such as self-inflicted pain (self-flagellation), sleeping without a pillow or sleeping on the floor, and if compatible with their family or professional duties, remaining silent for certain hours during the day. Mortification has a long history in many world religions, including the Catholic Church. It has been endorsed by popes as a way of following Christ, who died in a bloody crucifixion and who, speaking of anybody that sought to be his disciple, said: "let him deny himself, take up his cross daily and follow me" (Luke 9:23). Supporters say that opposition to mortification is rooted in having lost (1) the "sense of the enormity of sin" or offense against God, and the consequent penance, both interior and exterior, (2) the notions of "wounded human nature" and of concupiscence or inclination to sin, and thus the need for "spiritual battle", and (3) a spirit of sacrifice for love and "supernatural ends", and not only for physical enhancement.

Organization and activities

Governance

In Pope John Paul II's 1982 decree known as the Apostolic constitution Ut Sit, Opus Dei was established as a personal prelature, a new official structure of the Catholic Church, similar to a diocese in that it contains lay people and secular priests who are led by a bishop. However, whereas a bishop normally has a territory or diocese, the prelate of Opus Dei is pastor to the members and priests of Opus Dei worldwide, no matter what diocese they are in. To date, Opus Dei is the only personal prelature in existence. In addition to being governed by Ut Sit and by the Catholic Church's general law, Opus Dei is governed by the church's Particular Law concerning Opus Dei, otherwise known as Opus Dei's statutes. This specifies the objectives and workings of the prelature. The prelature is under the Congregation for Bishops.

The head of the Opus Dei prelature is known as the prelate. The prelate is the primary governing authority and is assisted by two councils—the General Council (made up of men) and the Central Advisory (made up of women). The prelate holds his position for life. The current prelate of Opus Dei is Fernando Ocáriz Braña, who became the third prelate of Opus Dei on 23 January 2017. The first prelate of Opus Dei was Álvaro del Portillo, who held the position from 1982 until his death in 1994.

Opus Dei's highest assembled bodies are the General Congresses, which are usually convened once every eight years. There are separate congresses for the men's and women's branches of Opus Dei. The General Congresses are made up of members appointed by the prelate and are responsible for advising him about the prelature's future. The men's General Congress also elects the prelate from a list of candidates chosen by their female counterparts. After the death of a prelate, a special elective General Congress is convened. The women nominate their preferred candidates for the prelate and is voted upon by the men to become the next prelate—an appointment that must be confirmed by the Pope.

Membership

Based on the language of Catholic Church law and theology, the prelature calls the people under the pastoral care of the prelate as "faithful of the prelature", since the term member connotes an association rather than a hierarchical structure such as a prelature or a diocese.

, the faithful of the Opus Dei Prelature numbered 95,318 members, of which 93,203 are lay persons, men and women, and 2,115 priests. These figures do not include the priest members of Opus Dei's Priestly Society of the Holy Cross, estimated to number 2,000 in the year 2005.

About 60 percent of Opus Dei faithful reside in Europe, and 35 percent reside in the Americas. Women comprise 57% of the total membership. According to the study of John Allen, for the most part, Opus Dei faithful belong to the middle to low levels in society in terms of education, income, and social status.

Opus Dei is made up of several different types of faithful. According to the Statutes of Opus Dei, the distinction derives from the degree to which they make themselves available for the official activities of the Prelature and for giving formation according to the spirit of Opus Dei.

Supernumeraries, the largest type, currently account for about 70% of the total membership. Typically, supernumeraries are married men and women with careers. Supernumeraries devote a portion of their day to prayer, in addition to attending regular meetings and taking part in activities such as retreats. Due to their career and family obligations, supernumeraries are not as available to the organization as the other types of faithful, but they typically contribute financially to Opus Dei, and they lend other types of assistance as their circumstances permit.

Numeraries, the second largest type of the faithful of Opus Dei, comprise about 20% of the total membership. Numeraries are celibate members who give themselves in "full availability" for the official undertakings of the Prelature. This includes full availability for giving doctrinal and ascetical formation to other members, for staffing the internal government of Opus Dei if asked by the regional directors, and for moving to other countries to start or help with apostolic activities if asked by the prelate. Because they are making themselves fully available to do whatever needs to be done for the undertakings of the Prelature, numeraries are expected to live in special centers run by Opus Dei, and the question of which particular center a numerary will live in depends upon the regional needs. "Numerary" is a general term for persons who form part of the permanent staff of an organization. Therefore, in order to maintain a family atmosphere in the centers (rather than an institutional one), it is considered very important for numeraries to participate in daily meals and "get-togethers" in which they converse and share news. Both men and women may become numeraries in Opus Dei, although the centers are strictly gender-specific. Numeraries generally have jobs outside of Opus Dei, although some are asked to work internally full-time, and many modify the way that they go about their professional goals in order to be available for the Prelature. They devote the bulk of their income to the organization.

Numerary assistants are a type of numerary that exists in the Women's Branch of Opus Dei. Their full availability for the Prelature is lived out as full availability for doing a specific type of work, namely looking after the domestic needs of the conference centers and the residential centers of Opus Dei. Hence they live in special centers run by Opus Dei and do not have jobs outside the centers.

Associates are celibate faithful who make themselves fully available to God and to others in apostolic celibacy and stably take on at least one (sometimes more) apostolic assignment(s) from the Prelature in giving doctrinal and ascetical formation and/or coordinating activities. They differ from numeraries in not making themselves "fully" available to staff the official undertakings of the Prelature, instead giving themselves in additional social realities, such as through their profession or to their own families. Because of this difference in availability for the official activities of Opus Dei, unlike numeraries the associates do not live in Opus Dei centers but maintain their own abodes. Some of their family life (emotional and social support) comes from the centers of Opus Dei, some from other associates of Opus Dei, and some from their personal families and friends; the precise ratio of this distribution depends upon the circumstances of the individual associate.

The Clergy of the Opus Dei Prelature are priests who are under the jurisdiction of the prelate of Opus Dei. They are a minority in Opus Dei—only about 2% of Opus Dei members are part of the clergy. Typically, they are numeraries or associates who ultimately joined the priesthood.

The Priestly Society of the Holy Cross consists of priests associated with Opus Dei. Part of the society is made up of the clergy of the Opus Dei prelature—priests who fall under the jurisdiction of the Opus Dei prelature are automatically members of the Priestly Society. Other members in the society are diocesan priests—clergymen who remain under the jurisdiction of a geographically defined diocese. These priests are considered full members of Opus Dei who are given its spiritual training. They do not, however, report to the Opus Dei prelate but to their own diocesan bishop. , there were roughly two thousand of these priests.

The Cooperators of Opus Dei are non-members who collaborate in some way with Opus Dei—usually through praying, charitable contributions, or by providing some other assistance. Cooperators are not required to be celibate or to adhere to any other special requirements, and are not even required to be Christian. There were 164,000 cooperators in the year 2005.

In accordance with Catholic theology, membership is granted when a vocation or divine calling is presumed to have occurred.

Activities

Leaders of Opus Dei describe the organization as a teaching entity whose main activity is to train Catholics to assume personal responsibility in sanctifying the secular world from within. This teaching is done by means of theory and practice.

Its lay people and priests organize seminars, workshops, retreats, and classes to help people put the Christian faith into practice in their daily lives. Spiritual direction, one-on-one coaching with a more experienced lay person or priest, is considered the "paramount means" of training. Through these activities, they provide religious instruction (doctrinal formation), coaching in spirituality for lay people (spiritual formation), character and moral education (human formation), lessons in sanctifying one's work (professional formation), and know-how in evangelizing one's family and workplace (apostolic formation).

The official Catholic document, which established the prelature, states that Opus Dei strives "to put into practice the teaching of the universal call to sanctity, and to promote at all levels of society the sanctification of ordinary work, and by means of ordinary work." Thus, the founder and his followers describe members of Opus Dei as resembling the members of the early Christian Church—ordinary workers who seriously sought holiness with nothing exterior to distinguish them from other citizens.

Opus Dei runs residential centers throughout the world. These centers provide residential housing for celibate members and provide doctrinal and theological education. Opus Dei is also responsible for a variety of non-profit institutions called "Corporate Works of Opus Dei." A study of the year 2005 showed that members have cooperated with other people in setting up a total of 608 social initiatives: schools and university residences (68%), technical or agricultural training centers (26%), universities, business schools, and hospitals (6%). The University of Navarra in Pamplona, Spain, and the Austral University in Buenos Aires, Argentina, are both examples of the corporate work of Opus Dei. These universities usually perform very high in international rankings. IESE, the University of Navarra's Business School, was adjudged one of the best in the world by the Financial Times and the Economist Intelligence Unit. The total assets of non-profits connected to Opus Dei are worth at least $2.8 billion.

Relations with Catholic leaders

Leopoldo Eijo y Garay, the bishop of Madrid, where Opus Dei was born, supported Opus Dei and defended it in the 1940s by saying that "this opus is truly Dei" (this work is truly God's). Contrary to attacks of secrecy and heresy, the bishop described Opus Dei's founder as someone who was "open as a child" and "most obedient to the Church hierarchy."

In the 1950s, Pope Pius XII told the most senior Australian bishop, Cardinal Norman Gilroy, that Escrivá "is a true saint, a man sent by God for our times". Pius XII gave Opus Dei the canonical status of "pontifical right", an institution depending directly and exclusively on the Vatican in its internal governance.

In 1960, Pope John XXIII commented that Opus Dei opens up "unsuspected horizons of apostolate". Furthermore, in 1964, Pope Paul VI praised the organization in a handwritten letter to Escrivá, saying:
Opus Dei is "a vigorous expression of the perennial youth of the Church, fully open to the demands of a modern apostolate... We look with paternal satisfaction on all that Opus Dei has achieved and is achieving for the kingdom of God, the desire of doing good that guides it, the burning love for the Church and its visible head that distinguishes it, and the ardent zeal for souls that impels it along the arduous and difficult paths of the apostolate of presence and witness in every sector of contemporary life."

The relationship between Paul VI and Opus Dei, according to Alberto Moncada, a doctor of sociology and ex-member, was "stormy." After the Second Vatican Council concluded in 1965, Pope Paul VI denied Opus Dei's petition to become a personal prelature, Moncada stated.

Pope John Paul I, a few years before his election, wrote that Escrivá was more radical than other saints who taught about the universal call to holiness. While others emphasized monastic spirituality applied to lay people, Escrivá "it is the material work itself which must be turned into prayer and sanctity," thus providing a lay spirituality.

Criticisms against Opus Dei have prompted Catholic scholars and writers like Piers Paul Read and Vittorio Messori to call Opus Dei a sign of contradiction, in reference to the biblical quote of Jesus as a "sign that is spoken against". John Carmel Heenan, Cardinal Archbishop of Westminster said "One of the proofs of God's favor is to be a sign of contradiction. Almost all founders of societies in the Church have suffered. Monsignor Escrivá de Balaguer is no exception. Opus Dei has been attacked, and its motives misunderstood. In this country and elsewhere, an inquiry has always vindicated Opus Dei."

One of Opus Dei's most prominent supporters was Pope John Paul II. John Paul II cited Opus Dei's aim of sanctifying secular activities as a "great ideal." He emphasized that Escrivá's founding of Opus Dei was ductus divina inspiratione, led by divine inspiration, and he granted the organization its status as a personal prelature. Stating that Escrivá is "counted among the great witnesses of Christianity," John Paul II canonized him in 2002 and called him "the saint of ordinary life." Of the organization, John Paul II said:
[Opus Dei] has as its aim the sanctification of one's life, while remaining within the world at one's place of work and profession: to live the Gospel in the world, while living immersed in the world, but in order to transform it, and to redeem it with one's personal love for Christ. This is truly a great ideal, which right from the beginning has anticipated the theology of the lay state of the Second Vatican Council and the post-conciliar period.

One-third of the world's bishops petitioned for the canonization of Escrivá. During the canonization, there were 42 cardinals and 470 bishops from around the world, generals superior of many religious institutes, and representatives of various Catholic groups. During those days, these church officials commented on the universal reach and validity of the message of the founder. For his canonization homily, John Paul II said: With the teachings of St. Josemaría, "it is easier to understand what the Second Vatican Council affirmed: 'there is no question, then, of the Christian message inhibiting men from building up the world ... on the contrary, it is an incentive to do these very things' (Vatican II, Gaudium et spes, n. 34)."

Concerning the group's role in the Catholic Church, critics have argued that Opus Dei's unique status as a personal prelature gives it too much independence, making it essentially a "church within a church" and that Opus Dei exerts a disproportionately large influence within the Catholic Church itself, as illustrated, for example, by the rapid canonization of Escrivá, which some considered to be irregular (27 years). In contrast, Catholic officials say that church authorities have even greater control of Opus Dei now that its head is a prelate appointed by the Pope, and its status as a prelature "precisely means dependence." Allen says that Escrivá's relatively quick canonization does not have anything to do with power but with improvements in procedures and John Paul II's decision to make Escrivá's sanctity and message known. The canonizations of John Paul II himself and Mother Teresa were much faster than Escrivá's.

Pope Benedict XVI has been a particularly strong supporter of Opus Dei and of Escrivá. Pointing to the name "Work of God," Benedict XVI (then Cardinal Joseph Ratzinger) wrote that "The Lord simply made use of [Escrivá] who allowed God to work." Ratzinger cited Escrivá for correcting the mistaken idea that holiness is reserved for some extraordinary people who are completely different from ordinary sinners: Even if he can be very weak, with many mistakes in his life, a saint is nothing other than to speak with God as a friend speaks with a friend, allowing God to work, the Only One who can really make the world both good and happy.

Ratzinger spoke of Opus Dei's "surprising union of absolute fidelity to the Church's great tradition, to its faith, and unconditional openness to all the challenges of this world, whether in the academic world, in the field of work, or in matters of the economy, etc." He further explained:
the theocentrism of Escrivá ... means this confidence in the fact that God is working now and we ought only to put ourselves at his disposal ... This, for me, is a message of greatest importance. It is a message that leads to overcoming what could be considered the great temptation of our times: the pretense that after the 'Big Bang' God retired from history.

Pope Francis is "the first Pope who has dealt with Opus Dei closely as a bishop," and according to James V. Schall, S.J., is a  "friend of Opus Dei". Francis referred to St. Josemaria as "a precursor of Vatican II in proposing the universal call to holiness." In the analysis of John Allen, Pope Francis' strong dislike for clericalism, which he calls "one of the worst evils" in the church, is a key factor for "what Francis admires about Opus Dei since Escrivá’s emphasis on the dignity of the laity was a challenge to the ultra-clerical ethos of Spanish Catholicism in the late 1920s." He has a devotion to St. Josemaria, and he prayed before his relics for 45 minutes when he once visited the church of the prelature in Rome. Francis beatified Alvaro del Portillo, the successor of Escrivá. What Bergoglio most liked about Opus Dei was the work done for the poor by one of its schools in Buenos Aires. He thanks Opus Dei for its work to further the holiness of priests in the Roman Curia.

Controversy

Throughout its history, Opus Dei has been criticized from many quarters, prompting journalists to describe Opus Dei as "the most controversial force in the Catholic Church" and founder Josemaría Escrivá as a "polarizing" figure. Criticism of Opus Dei has centered on allegations of secretiveness, controversial and aggressive recruiting methods, strict rules governing members, elitism and misogyny, and support of or participation in authoritarian or right-wing governments, including the fascist Franco regime which governed in Spain until 1978. The mortification of the flesh practiced by some of its members is also criticized. Opus Dei has also been criticized for allegedly seeking independence and more influence within the Catholic Church.

However, according to several journalists who have researched Opus Dei separately, many criticisms against Opus Dei are based on fabrications by opponents. Several popes and other Catholic leaders have endorsed what they see as its innovative teaching on the sanctifying value of work, and its fidelity to Catholic beliefs. In 2002, Pope John Paul II canonized Josemaría Escrivá, and called him "the saint of ordinary life."

In recent years, Opus Dei has received international attention due to the novel The Da Vinci Code and its film version of 2006, both of which prominent Christians and non-believers criticized as misleading, inaccurate and anti-Catholic.

Critics such as the Jesuit Wladimir Ledóchowski sometimes refer to Opus Dei as a Catholic (or Christian or "white") form of Freemasonry.

Supporting views

According to several journalists who have worked independently on Opus Dei, such as John L. Allen Jr., Vittorio Messori, Patrice de Plunkett, Maggy Whitehouse, Noam Friedlander many of the criticisms against Opus Dei are myths and unproven tales. Allen, Messori, and Plunkett say that most of these myths were created by its opponents, with Allen adding that he perceives that Opus Dei members generally practice what they preach.

Allen, Messori, and Plunkett also state that accusations that Opus Dei is secretive are unfounded. These accusations stem from a clerical paradigm which expects Opus Dei members to behave as monks and clerics, people who are traditionally known and externally identifiable as seekers of holiness. In contrast, these journalists continue, Opus Dei's lay members, like any normal Catholic professional, are ultimately responsible for their personal actions, and do not externally represent the organization which provides them religious education. Writer and broadcast analyst John L. Allen Jr. states that Opus Dei provides abundant information about itself. These journalists have stated that the historic roots of criticisms against Opus Dei can be found in influential clerical circles.

As to its alleged participation in right-wing politics, especially the Francoist regime, British historians Paul Preston and Brian Crozier state that the Opus Dei members who were Franco's ministers were appointed for their talent and not for their Opus Dei membership. Also, there were notable members of Opus Dei who were vocal critics of the Franco Regime such as Rafael Calvo Serer and Antonio Fontán, who was the first President of the Senate in Spain, following the adoption of a democratic Constitution. The German historian and Opus Dei member Peter Berglar calls any connection made between Opus Dei and Franco's regime a "gross slander." At the end of Franco's regime, Opus Dei members were 50:50 for and against Franco, according to John Allen. Similarly Álvaro del Portillo, the former prelate of Opus Dei, said that any statements that Escrivá supported Hitler were "a patent falsehood," that were part of "a slanderous campaign". He and others have stated that Escrivá condemned Hitler as a "rogue", a "racist" and a "tyrant". Opus Dei spokespersons also deny claims that Opus Dei members worked with General Pinochet. Various authors and researchers state that Escrivá was staunchly non-political, and detested dictatorships. Allen wrote that, compared with other Catholic organizations, Opus Dei's stress on freedom and personal responsibility is extraordinarily strong. There are many Opus Dei members who are identified with center or left-wing politics, including Ruth Kelly, Jorge Rossi Chavarría, Mario Fernández Baeza, Mario Maiolo, and Jesus Estanislao.

While Opus Dei spokespersons have admitted mistakes in dealing with some members and do not, as a rule, contest their grievances, supporters have rejected generalizations merely based on negative experiences of some members.

Opus Dei is not "elitist" in the sense in which people often invoke the term, meaning an exclusively white-collar phenomenon, concluded John Allen. He observed that among its members are barbers, bricklayers, mechanics and fruit sellers. Most supernumeraries are living ordinary middle-class lives, he said.

Regarding alleged misogyny, John Allen states that half of the leadership positions in Opus Dei are held by women, and they supervise men.

As regards the claim that religious people in Spain, including Opus Dei members, were involved in abduction of children during the Franco era, an investigation found that DNA analysis of 81 cases ruled out that they were stolen babies. The supreme court of Spain did not consider the first case of stolen babies to be proven, and the chief prosecutor of the Basque Country, said that "not even reasonable evidence" of any abduction of babies had been found, after special investigations of the police.

Criticism
Critics of Opus Dei include María del Carmen Tapia, an ex-member who was a high-ranking officer of Opus Dei for many years, liberal Catholic theologians such as Fr. James Martin, a Jesuit writer and editor and supporters of Liberation theology, such as journalist Penny Lernoux and Michael Walsh, a writer on religious matters and former Jesuit.

Critics state that Opus Dei is "intensely secretive"—for example, members generally do not disclose their affiliation with Opus Dei in public. Further, under the 1950 constitution, members were expressly forbidden to reveal themselves without the permission of their superiors. This practice has led to much speculation about who may be a member. Due in part to its secrecy, the Jesuit-run magazine America referred to it as, "....the most controversial group in the Catholic Church today."

Opus Dei has been accused of deceptive and aggressive recruitment practices, such as showering potential members with intense praise ("Love bombing"), and instructing numeraries to form friendships and attend social gatherings explicitly for recruiting purposes.

Critics allege that Opus Dei maintains an extremely high degree of control over its members—for instance, past rules required numeraries to submit their incoming and outgoing mail to their superiors for inspection, and members are forbidden to read certain books without permission from their superiors. Critics charge that Opus Dei pressures numeraries to sever contact with non-members, including their own families. Exit counselor David Clark has described Opus Dei as "very cult-like".

Critics assert that Escrivá and the organization supported radical right-wing governments, such as those of Franco, Augusto Pinochet and Alberto Fujimori of Peru during the 1990s. Both Pinochet's and Fujimori's ministries and prominent supporters allegedly included members of Opus Dei, but there are also prominent Opus Dei members in parties that opposed those governments. Likewise, among Opus Dei members there were also strong detractors of Franco, such as Antonio Fontán.  There have also been allegations that Escrivá expressed sympathy for Adolf Hitler. One former Opus Dei priest, Vladimir Felzmann, who has become a vocal Opus Dei critic, says that Escrivá once remarked that Hitler had been "badly treated" by the world and he further declared that "Hitler couldn't have been such a bad person. He couldn't have killed six million [Jews]. It couldn't have been more than four million."

Opus Dei has also been accused of elitism through targeting of "the intellectual elite, the well-to-do, and the socially prominent."

As members of Opus Dei are Catholics, Opus Dei has been subjected to the same criticisms targeted to Catholicism in general. For example, Opus Dei's position has been "to oppose  sexual freedoms and promote conservative morals," according to an investigative report produced by the advocacy group Catholics for Choice. The report further cites a study from sociologist Marco Burgos alleging Opus Dei interference in sex education programs in Honduras that contradict the Catholic faith.

Between 1950 and 1980, as many as 300,000 illegal adoptions occurred in Spain in a scandal known as the Lost children of Francoism. Many Catholic clergy and religious sisters at church-sponsored hospitals or other charitable organizations in Spain are alleged to have been involved, including members of Opus Dei.

The Opus Dei organisation has been described as a "Holy Mafia" or "Santa Mafia" in the 1970s due to alleged "inscrutable business practices".

After conducting a critical study of Opus Dei, Catholic journalist John L. Allen Jr. concluded that Opus Dei should (1) be more transparent, (2) collaborate with members of religious institutes, and (3) encourage its members to air out in public their criticisms of the institution.

Other views
Sociologists Peter Berger and Samuel Huntington suggest that Opus Dei is involved in "a deliberate attempt to construct an alternative modernity," one that engages modern culture while at the same time is resolutely loyal to Catholic traditions. Van Biema of Time magazine emphasises Opus Dei's Spanish roots as a source of misunderstandings in the Anglo-Saxon world, and suggests that as the United States becomes more Hispanic, controversies about Opus Dei (and similar Catholic organizations) will decrease.

In her 2006 book on Opus Dei, Maggy Whitehouse, a non-Catholic journalist, argues that the relative autonomy of each director and center has resulted in mistakes at the local level. She recommends greater consistency and transparency for Opus Dei, which she sees as having learned the lesson of greater openness when it faced the issues raised by The Da Vinci Code and other critics.

See also

 Controversies about Opus Dei
 L'Opus Dei: enquête sur le "monstre" [Opus Dei: Investigation on the "monster"] (book)
 List of members of Opus Dei
 Opus Dei and politics
 Opus Dei: An Objective Look Behind the Myths and Reality of the Most Controversial Force in the Catholic Church (book)
 Opus Dei in society
 Parents for Education Foundation (PARED)
 List of Opus Dei saints and beatified people

Footnotes

Further reading

 Allen, John, Jr. (2005). Opus Dei: An Objective Look Behind the Myths and Reality of the Most Controversial Force in the Catholic Church, Doubleday Religion. —Interview: The Word From Rome December 16, 2005. Online excerpts: Opus Dei: An Introduction , Chapter I: A Quick Overview of Opus Dei, Chapter 7: Opus Dei and Secrecy
 Berglar, Peter (1994). Opus Dei. Life and Work of its Founder. Scepter.—online here 
 
De Plunkett, Patrice (2006). L'Opus Dei : enquête sur le "monstre". Presses de la Renaissance
 E.B.E - "Opus Dei as divine revelation" (2016, 576 pages). An historical and theological study by a former member. It includes unpublished historical documents (the Regulations of 1941, several letters of Escrivá to Franco, documents about Escrivá's request for being appointed bishop, etc.).  (paperback) and ASIN: B01D5MNGD2 (ebook - Amazon). Online Preview on Amazon website here 
 Estruch, Joan (1995), Saints and Schemers: Opus Dei and its paradoxes. Oxford University Press—trans. of L'Opus Dei i les seves paradoxes (in Catalan)—online Spanish version here Opus Dei: Santos y pillos. Índice
 Friedlander, Noam (2005). "What Is Opus Dei? Tales of God, Blood, Money and Faith" Collins & Brown. . .—a book review titled "A Wholesome Reality Hides Behind A Dark Conspiracy"
 Hahn, Scott (2006). Ordinary Work, Extraordinary Grace: My Spiritual Journey in Opus Dei. Random House Doubleday Religion. —online excerpt of Chapter One here 
 John Paul II. Sacred Congregation for Bishops. (23 August 1982). Vatican Declaration on Opus Dei.—online here Opus Dei - Opus Dei - Vatican Declaration on Opus Dei
 Luciani, Albino (John Paul I) (25 July 1978). "Seeking God through everyday work". Il Gazzettino Venice.—online here 
 Martin, James, S.J. (25 February 1995). "Opus Dei in the United States". America Magazine.—online here America | The National Catholic Weekly
 —online version here 
 O'Connor, William. Opus Dei: An Open Book. A Reply to "The Secret World of Opus Dei" by Michael Walsh, Mercier Press, Dublin, 1991—online here Opus Dei: An Open Book
 Oates, MT, et al. (2009). Women of Opus Dei: In Their Own Words. Crossroad Publishing Company. .
 Ratzinger, Joseph (Benedict XVI) (9 October 2002). "St. Josemaria: God is very much at work in our world today". L'Osservatore Romano Weekly Edition in English, p. 3.—online here 
 Schall, James, S.J. (Aug–September 1996). "Of Saintly Timber". Homiletic and Pastoral Review.—review of Estruch's work, online here  
 Shaw, Russel (1994). Ordinary Christians in the World. Office of Communications, Prelature of Opus Dei in the US.—online here

External links

Opus Dei official sites
 
 The founder of Opus Dei: Official Site
 Writings of the founder of Opus Dei
 St. Josemaría Escrivá Historical Institute, Rome
 YouTube Channel – Opus Dei
 YouTube Channel – St. Josemaria

 
20th-century Catholicism
1928 establishments in Spain
Catholic spirituality
Catholic personal prelatures
Pope John Paul II
Christian organizations established in 1928
Catholic organizations established in the 20th century
Second Vatican Council
Roman Catholic dioceses and prelatures established in the 20th century
Conservatism